Odesa International Airport  is an international airport of Odesa, the third largest city of Ukraine, located  southwest from its city centre.

On 24 February 2022, Ukraine closed airspace to civilian flights due to the Russian invasion of Ukraine.

Facilities
The area of Odesa International airport is 570 hectares. Technical service of airport is based on 2,800 square meters area and represented by four parking places to provide technical service to four planes simultaneously. European standards classify the airport as "class 1". The airport has ILS CAT I status.

The airport's runways either were or are co-used by the Ukrainian Air Force.

History
The airport was built in 1961.

In May 2007, the airport started construction work that included extending the main runway.

In 2009, it served 651,000 passengers.

On 8 June 2012, builders started to prepare the land on which the new terminal would be built. The area of the new terminal was to be 26,000 square meters, with the capacity for 1,000 passengers per hour (1.5–2 million passengers per year). It would have 16 check-in desks, and four telescopic gangways, and the number of bus pick-up points would be increased from two to five. The construction of the new terminal was planned to be completed by the end of 2013. However, due to extensive delays, it was opened for arrivals on 15 April 2017. It is to serve both international and domestic flights. The estimated cost of the work was around 45–60 million. Airport Consulting Vienna company has developed a master plan, business plan and evaluation of the technical concept of the airport. The chief designer of the project is the Spanish company Ineco.

In 2019, Odesa International Airport announced an international competition for the best idea of a sculpture-symbol of the city's air gates. The first place was taken by Ukrainian artist Stepan Ryabchenko. His sculpture "Sphere" will be made and installed near the new airport terminal.

During expansion work in 2021, workers found a mass grave containing 5,000-8,000 skeletons believed to be victims of the Holodomor.

2022 Russo-Ukrainian War
On 30 April 2022 a Russian missile struck the newly constructed runway, destroying it. Ukrainian officials stated that a Bastion missile was used, and no one was hurt. The Russian military later confirmed the attack.

Airlines and destinations

As of 24 February 2022, all passenger flights have been suspended indefinitely.

Statistics

See also
List of airports in Ukraine
List of the busiest airports in Ukraine
List of the busiest airports in Europe
List of the busiest airports in the former USSR

References

External links

Official website
NOAA/NWS current weather observations
ASN Accident history for UKOO

Airports in Ukraine
Airport
Buildings and structures in Odesa
1961 establishments in Ukraine
Airports established in 1961